

Old Westbury Gardens is the former estate of businessman John Shaffer Phipps (1874–1958), an heir to the Phipps family fortune, in Nassau County, New York. Located at 71 Old Westbury Road in Old Westbury, the property was converted into a museum home in 1959. It is open for tours from April through October.

History 
Work on the estate began in 1903, when John Shaffer Phipps promised his fiancée, Margarita Grace (a daughter of businessman Michael P. Grace), that he would build her a home in the United States that resembled her family's British residence at Battle Abbey in Battle, East Sussex, England. The house was ready in 1906 for Phipps, his wife and their young children.

Westbury House, the Carolean Revival (Charles II style) mansion designed by British designer George A. Crawley with assistance from American architect Grosvenor Atterbury, contains 23 rooms. The grounds cover .

The painting of Mrs. Henry Phipps and Her Grandson Winston (1906–07) by John Singer Sargent hangs in the dining room. Winston Guest was the child, and his godfather was Winston Churchill.

In media 
Scenes of the driveway and some of the ground floor interiors were used in the 1970 film Love Story to depict the family home of Oliver Barrett IV, played by Ryan O'Neal. Old Westbury Gardens is a popular wedding venue. Other movies filmed on the grounds include North by Northwest, The Age of Innocence, Wolf, To Wong Foo, Thanks for Everything! Julie Newmar, Cruel Intentions, 8MM, The Manchurian Candidate (2004), Hitch, Bernard and Doris and American Gangster. Scenes from the television series Pushing Daisies, Gossip Girl and Royal Pains also used the location in filming. It served as the inspiration for the Buchanan Estate featured in Baz Luhrmann's 2013 film adaption of The Great Gatsby by his wife and production designer Catherine Martin.

References

External links

 Official website
 Pictures of 'Westbury House' and Old Westbury Gardens
 Dobrin, Lyn. (2001, March). Old Westbury Gardens – Long Island, New York. Flower & Garden Magazine.
Westbury House, Old Westbury, NY – sample page in a coffee-table book

Mansions of Gold Coast, Long Island
Museums in Nassau County, New York
Historic house museums in New York (state)
Gardens in New York (state)
Castles in the United States
Houses on the National Register of Historic Places in New York (state)
National Register of Historic Places in North Hempstead (town), New York
Houses in Nassau County, New York
Landscape design history of the United States
Gilded Age mansions